Abiodun Taiwo Olaoye is an Anglican bishop in Nigeria: he was a Missionary bishop within the Anglican Province of Abuja and is now the Bishop of Osun North.

Notes

Living people
Missionary bishops in the Province of Abuja
21st-century Anglican bishops in Nigeria
Year of birth missing (living people)
Anglican bishops of Osun North